This is a list of octagon houses.  The style became popular in the United States and Canada following the publication of Orson Squire Fowler's 1848 book The Octagon House, A Home for All.  In the United States, 68 surviving octagon houses are included on the U.S. National Register of Historic Places (NRHP).  The earliest and most notable octagon  house in the Americas was Thomas Jefferson's 1806 Poplar Forest.

Orson Squire Fowler's 1848 book The Octagon House, A Home for All and his "monumental" four-story, 60-room house built during 1848–1853, Fowler's Folly in Fishkill, New York, provided inspiration for a nationwide fad.  Fifty-nine of the sixty-six pre-Civil War houses on the NRHP were built between 1849 and 1861.  It is reported that the owner of the first-built of these, the Rich-Twinn Octagon House in western New York, was impressed by seeing an octagon house in the Hudson River Valley, presumably Fowler's home under construction.

Canada
At least 20 historic octagon houses are known to exist in Canada, distributed across four eastern provinces. Extant octagon houses in Canada include the following:

In New Brunswick
 Pocologan
Sackville: Captain George Anderson House, built in 1855, is a locally designated heritage site
 In Nova Scotia
Tatamagouche: Fraser Octagon House, built in 1857,  provincially designated heritage site
 In Ontario
{|
|  style="vertical-align:top; width:10%;"|
 Ameliasburg, Prince Edward County
 Bowmanville
 Bracebridge: Woodchester Villa, a provincially designated heritage site
 Brantford
 Burlington: The Thomas Pickett Octagonal House, built 1860, at 6103 Guelph Line, designated under the Ontario Heritage Act
 Calabogie: 15 Octagon Lane
 Clark's Corners, Oxford County
 Kingsville
|  style="vertical-align:top; width:20%;"|
 Rupert Octagonal House (1855), Maple, at 2600 Major MacKenzie Drive, now Delano Academy
 Milton
 Morton, northeast of Kingston, former octagon schoolhouse, also used as a residence
 Mount Pleasant, Brant County: 646 Mount Pleasant Road, now used as a spa
 Niagara Falls: Bradley Octagon House, built 1906, at 5783 Summer Street
 Otterville: Woodlawn Octagon House, built 1861, moved from Millvale
 Peel Region: 8280 Heritage Road, near Huttonville
 Port Hope, built 1856
 Picton, Prince Edward County, built ca. 1860
 Westport, on Upper Rideau Lake
|}
In Quebec
Guérin

United States

Notable octagon houses in the U.S. include the following, more than 80 in number, in date built order.  The octagonal outlines of these houses may be
seen in Google maps and other satellite photo services, by zooming in from satellite view above, to their locations.  Specifically, almost all of the following listed ones are mapped and may be observed via satellite view in the Google external link here (click on "Map of all coordinates" to the right).

Of these, six are further designated National Historic Landmarks of the United States: Armour-Stiner House in the Hudson River valley in New York, which is perhaps the only domed octagon house in the world; The Octagon House in Washington, D.C. (which is actually more of a hexagon), where President Madison lived after the White House was burnt by the British; Thomas Jefferson's retreat Poplar Forest; May's Folly in Georgia;  Samuel Sloan-designed Longwood in Natchez, Mississippi, still unfinished after its construction was halted by the American Civil War; and Waverley, also in Mississippi.

At least one of the houses has been claimed to have been used as "stations" sheltering escaped slaves on the Underground Railroad: the Octagon House in Fond du Lac, Wisconsin, although that claim has been disputed.
 
Including post-Civil War constructed houses, there are now at least 84 octagon houses that are listed on the National Register of Historic Places.

Octagon houses were particularly popular in New York State.  There were 120 octagon houses in New York State, of which 13 are listed on the National Register and listed below.

In 1958 Carl F. Schmidt published The Octagon Fad which attempted to inventory the Fowler-inspired homes, most of which were built prior to 1915 in North America. However, only a small fraction of the total are notable and extant.

New Jersey is believed to have had 46 octagon houses and octagon school houses, with 15 houses and one schoolhouse surviving in 2016.

Notable former octagon houses

See also

List of octagonal buildings and structures

Notes

References

External links
"Inventory of Older Octagon, Hexagon, and Round Houses": directory of historic U.S. and Canadian houses with many photos, compiled by Robert Kline.
Octagonal Houses in Canada

Octagon houses